John Otway O'Conner Cuffe, 3rd Earl of Desart (12 October 1818 – 1 April 1865), styled Viscount Castlecuffe until 1820, was an Irish Conservative politician. He served as Under-Secretary of State for War and the Colonies between March and December 1852 in the Earl of Derby's first administration.

Background
Desart was the son of John Cuffe, 2nd Earl of Desart, and Catherine, daughter of Maurice O'Connor. He succeeded in the earldom in November 1820, aged two, on the early death of his father.  He was educated at Eton College and entered Christ Church, Oxford in 1836 but took no degree.

Political career
Desart sat in the House of Commons as Member of Parliament for Ipswich between June and July 1842, when his election was declared void. He didn't stand in the subsequent by-election. In 1846 he was elected an Irish Representative Peer and thus took a seat in the House of Lords, which he held until his death in 1865. He served as Under-Secretary of State for War and the Colonies in Lord Derby's short-lived protectionist government of 1852.

Family
Lord Desart married Lady Elizabeth Lucy, daughter of John Campbell, 1st Earl Cawdor, in 1842. They had three sons and a daughter. He died at his London home in Eaton Square on 1 April 1865, through a fall suffered during an attack of paralysis, aged 46. He was succeeded in the earldom by his son, William. The Countess of Desart died in April 1898, aged 76.

References

External links 
 

1818 births
1865 deaths
People educated at Eton College
Members of the Parliament of the United Kingdom for Ipswich
Irish representative peers
Conservative Party (UK) MPs for English constituencies
UK MPs 1841–1847
Desart, E3
Earls of Desart